Doug Collins (born February 18, 1945) was a Canadian football player who played for the Ottawa Rough Riders and Hamilton Tiger-Cats. He won the Grey Cup in 1968, 1969 and 1973. He previously played college football at the University of Cincinnati. A brother, Ted Collins, also played in the CFL.

References

1946 births
Living people
Ottawa Rough Riders players
Hamilton Tiger-Cats players
Cincinnati Bearcats football players
Sportspeople from Windsor, Ontario
Players of Canadian football from Ontario
Canadian players of American football